Who is the Millionaire (Vietnamese: Ai là triệu phú) is a Vietnamese game show based on the original British format of Who Wants to Be a Millionaire?. The show is hosted by Lại Văn Sâm from its debut until 2017, Phan Đăng from 2018 to 2020, and Đinh Tiến Dũng from 2021 onwards. The main goal of the game is to win the top prize (50,000,000₫ in 2005; 100,000,000₫ from 2005 to 2007; 120,000,000₫ from 2007 to 2012; 150,000,000₫ from 2012 to 2021 and 250,000,000₫ from 2022 onward) by answering 15 multiple-choice questions correctly. There are four lifelines – 50:50, Phone a Friend, Plus One (first appeared in 2020) and Ask Two Experts (can be used after the fifth question, first appeared in 2020). Ai là triệu phú? has been broadcast since January 4, 2005 to today. It is shown on the Vietnamese TV station VTV3 on every Tuesday at 8:00 PM (from 2005 to 2016 and on January 31, 2017) and 8:30 PM (from January 3-24, 2017 and from February 7, 2017, onward) (UTC+7).

Money tree

Notable wins

Top prize winners 

 No one in the show has become the real top prize winner yet.

14th question correct 

 Nguyễn Lê Anh won 80,000,000₫ on September 9, 2008. Set record since 2008.
 Bùi Thị Hà Thanh and Đào Hồng Vũ won 80,000,000₫ on November 18, 2008 (Vietnamese Teachers' Day special)
 Lê Văn Tuân won 80,000,000₫ on April 12, 2011 (Hot Seat version)

Notable losses

Top prize losers 
 Trần Đặng Đăng Khoa won 22,000,000₫ on January 5, 2021. He made it to the 15th question but chose the wrong answer.

Basic information 
The game was played on VTV's 43rd anniversary special broadcast on September 6, 2013, on VTV1. It was hosted by Đức Khuê. Singer Phương Thanh participated in the game, answered all 15 questions correctly and won the prize of "work as an editor of Ai là triệu phú for one day".

 The show didn't air on February 8, 2005 due to 2005 Lunar New Year's eve.
 The show didn't air on June 21, 2005 due to 2005 VTV Cup matches.
 The show didn't air on June 13, 2006 due to World Cup Germany matches.
 The show didn't air on March 20, 2018 due to funeral of Phan Văn Khải.
 The show didn't air on January 28, 2020 due to Lunar New Year 2020.
 The show didn't air on January 26, 2021, due to the extended time for the 13th National Congress of the Communist Party of Vietnam's news.

Rồng vàng 
Before Ai là triệu phú, Ho Chi Minh City Television collaborated with Lasta Multimedia to produce a similar program called Rồng vàng, broadcast aired from May 25, 2003 to June 10, 2007, Contestant who answer all 15 questions correctly will receive a prize of VND 50,000,000.

Who is the Millionaire? - Hot Seat 
A Hot Seat version called Ai là triệu phú – Ghế nóng started on September 7, 2010 and ended on June 28, 2011. On July 5, 2011, the original version came back as a replacement for the Hot Seat version due to the viewers' feedbacks.

Note: For this version, the "MILLIONAIRE" milestone is unstable in question 15. For every one person who answers the question incorrectly or after the time is up and is removed from the game, this landmark will be reduced down a question.

See also
List of television programmes broadcast by Vietnam Television (VTV)

References

External links 
Official site

2000s Vietnamese television series
2005 Vietnamese television series debuts
Who Wants to Be a Millionaire?
2010s Vietnamese television series